The caldo Xóchitl is a Mexican traditional soup consisting of a chicken broth  that is poured into a bowl dish with shredded chicken and pieces of avocado, cilantro, tomato, green serrano pepper and onion. The shredded chicken has been cooked in water with salt in order to make the light broth.

See also
 List of soups

References

Further reading
 Peralta, Chepina (2003). Cocinando en microondas. Editorial Limusa, 2003. .

Mexican soups
Mexican chicken dishes